The Twelve Chairs is a 1933 Czechoslovak-Polish comedy film directed by Martin Frič and Michał Waszyński freely based on the eponymous 1928 novel by Soviet authors Ilya Ilf and Evgeny Petrov.

Cast
Vlasta Burian ...  Ferdinand Šuplátko 
Adolf Dymsza ...  antiquary Wladyslaw Kepka 
Zula Pogorzelska ...  director of the orphanage 
Zofia Jaroszewska ...  employee of the orphanage  
Wiktor Biegański ...  professor - spiritist 
Stanisław Belski ...  owner of the furniture shop 
Wanda Jarszewska   
Lo Kittay   
Józef Kondrat ...  chauffeur 
Eugeniusz Koszutski ...  clerk Repecki 
Aniela Miszczykówna ...  dentist 
Hanna Parysiewicz   
Stefan Szczuka ...  auctioneer 
Helena Zarembina

References

External links 
 

1933 films
1933 comedy films
1930s Czech-language films
Czechoslovak black-and-white films
Films based on Russian novels
Films directed by Martin Frič
Films directed by Michał Waszyński
Ilf and Petrov
Czechoslovak multilingual films
1930s Polish-language films
Polish black-and-white films
Polish comedy films
Polish multilingual films
Czechoslovak comedy films
1930s Czech films